Juan Carlos Darío Gaete Contreras (born 21 May 1997), known as Juan Carlos Gaete, is a Chilean footballer who plays as a forward for Chilean club Unión La Calera.

International career
He received his first call up to the Chile senior team to play the 2022 FIFA World Cup qualification matches against Uruguay and Colombia on 8 and 13 October respectively, but he was withdrawn from the squad due to injury before the second match.

Controversies
On 2019 season, Gaete joined Colo-Colo from Cobresal, but he left the training preseason in Buenos Aires returning to Chile to think about his future, according to Colo-Colo. Finally he was loaned to Deportes Santa Cruz at the Primera B, where again he had a similar episode.

On 12 August 2020, he told the reasons why left Colo-Colo, arguing he was disagreed with the money.

Career statistics

Club

Notes

References

External links

1997 births
Living people
Chilean footballers
Association football midfielders
Magallanes footballers
Cobresal footballers
Colo-Colo footballers
Deportes Santa Cruz footballers
Chilean Primera División players
Primera B de Chile players
Segunda División Profesional de Chile players